The Kronplatz (Ladin and Italian: Plan de Corones) is a mountain of the Dolomites in South Tyrol, northern Italy, with a summit elevation of  above sea level.

Kronplatz is not only the name of the mountain but of the whole holiday region. The holiday region of Kronplatz comprises the Puster Valley and some side valleys such as Ahrntal/Valle Aurina, Gsieser Tal/Val Casies, Antholzertal/Valle di Anterselva and part of Gadertal/Val Badia.

In the winter it is a ski resort and some of the lifts remain open in the summer for other activities such as walking, climbing and mountain biking.

 32 lifts
  of vertical descent
 60 pistes

References

External links 

  – 

Mountains of the Alps
Dolomites
Mountains of South Tyrol
Ski areas and resorts in Italy